Anoplocnemis phasiana is a species of sap-sucking insect in the genus Anoplocnemis. They are native to Asia where they are considered a major pest of many types of agricultural plants such as trees and shrubs, including legumes, sometimes known as the tip-withering bug.

References

Coreidae genera